Dror Kashtan (born 1 October 1944) is an Israeli former football player and manager. As a player, he represented the Israeli national team three times. As a manager, he took charge of numerous clubs as well as the Israel under-21 team, and, from 2006 to 2010, the senior national team.

Early life and managerial career
Born in Petah Tikva during the Mandate Palestine, Kashtan had an unremarkable playing career in Liga Leumit at Hapoel Petah Tikva, although He remains the only Israeli player to be called up to the full national team before playing a single match in league play. As a manager, he is the most successful manager of all time in Israeli football with six championships, six State Cups and three Toto Cups.

Honours

As player
Israeli Premier League (1):
1962–63
AFC Youth Championship (1):
1964

As manager
Israeli Premier League (6):
1981–82, 1986–87, 1992–93, 1995–96, 1997–98, 1999–2000
Israel State Cup (6):
1984, 1986, 1989, 1996, 2000, 2006
Toto Cup (3):
1997–98, 2001–02, 2004–05

References

1944 births
Living people
Israeli Jews
Israeli footballers
Liga Leumit players
Hapoel Petah Tikva F.C. players
Hapoel Kfar Saba F.C. players
Israel international footballers
Israeli football managers
Hapoel Kfar Saba F.C. managers
Beitar Jerusalem F.C. managers
Hapoel Petah Tikva F.C. managers
Maccabi Haifa F.C. managers
Maccabi Tel Aviv F.C. managers
Hapoel Tel Aviv F.C. managers
Israel national football team managers
Hapoel Haifa F.C. managers
Maccabi Petah Tikva F.C. managers
Bnei Yehuda Tel Aviv F.C. managers
Footballers from Petah Tikva
Association football midfielders